Oscar Martínez (born October 23, 1949) is an Argentine actor, author and theatre director. He received the Premio Konex de Platino in 1991 for his film work, and again in 2001 for his work as a theatre actor. He also received the Volpi Cup for Best Actor at the 73rd Venice Film Festival for his role in the comedy-drama The Distinguished Citizen.

Filmography

Television

Theater

Movies

References

1949 births
Living people
Volpi Cup for Best Actor winners